Himertula is a genus of bush crickets in the subfamily Phaneropterinae and tribe Letanini. Species can be found mostly in the Indian sub-continent.

Species
The Orthoptera Species File lists:
Himertula kinneari Uvarov, 1923
Himertula marginata (Brunner von Wattenwyl, 1878) - type species (as Himerta marginata Brunner von Wattenwyl - multiple specimens, including from "Himalaya")
Himertula marmorata Brunner von Wattenwyl, 1891
Himertula odonturaeformis Brunner von Wattenwyl, 1891
Himertula pallida Brunner von Wattenwyl, 1891
Himertula pallisignata Ingrisch & Shishodia, 1998
Himertula vidhyavathiae Ingrisch & Muralirangan, 2004
Himertula viridis Uvarov, 1927

References

External links

 

Orthoptera genera
Phaneropterinae